Carrier is a town in Garfield County, Oklahoma, United States. The population was 85 at the 2010 census.

History
The area around Carrier was first settled by farmers who moved there following the opening of the Cherokee Outlet in 1893. The origin of the name "Carrier" comes from the first postmaster, Solomon S. Carrier. Buildings were constructed to serve area farmers, including businesses, a school, and a Congregational church. In 1903, the Northwestern Townsite Company as the Arkansas Valley and Western Railway, which was planning to build a railway through the area, laid out a town site around a mile from the existing site, and the businesses relocated to the new location. In 1904, the railway was finished. The town's economy was primarily based on agriculture and the petroleum industry. The town was not incorporated until 1972. In the 21st century, many of the people who live in Carrier commute to work in Enid.

Geography
Carrier is located in northwestern Garfield County at  (36.476654, -98.020572). Oklahoma State Highway 45 runs through the center of town, leading east  to the outskirts of North Enid and west and north  to Goltry.

Demographics

As of the census of 2000, there were 77 people, 27 households, and 24 families residing in the town. There were 30 housing units at an average density of 24.7 per square mile (9.5/km2). The racial makeup of the town was 97.40% White and 2.60% Pacific Islander.

There were 27 households, out of which 37.0% had children under the age of 18 living with them, 66.7% were married couples living together, 14.8% had a female householder with no husband present, and 11.1% were non-families. 7.4% of all households were made up of individuals, and 3.7% had someone living alone who was 65 years of age or older. The average household size was 2.85 and the average family size was 3.04.

In the town, the population was spread out, with 29.9% under the age of 18, 3.9% from 18 to 24, 26.0% from 25 to 44, 32.5% from 45 to 64, and 7.8% who were 65 years of age or older. The median age was 41 years. For every 100 females, there were 87.8 males. For every 100 females age 18 and over, there were 107.7 males.

The median income for a household in the town was $40,250, and the median income for a family was $40,000. Males had a median income of $32,031 versus $16,875 for females. The per capita income for the town was $16,731. None of the population and none of the families were below the poverty line.

Education
It is zoned to Chisholm Public Schools.

References

External links
 Encyclopedia of Oklahoma History and Culture - Carrier

Towns in Garfield County, Oklahoma
Towns in Oklahoma